Billy Carol Pricer (September 3, 1934 – September 24, 1999) was a professional American football player who played running back for five seasons for the Baltimore Colts and Dallas Texans. Played for the University of Oklahoma football team from 1954 to 1956. During this time he played under Bud Wilkinson and, as a Sooner, never lost a game. Went into the draft in 1957 and was drafted in the 6th round (65th overall) by the Baltimore Colts.

References

External links

1934 births
1999 deaths
People from Perry, Oklahoma
Players of American football from Oklahoma
American football running backs
Oklahoma Sooners football players
Baltimore Colts players
Dallas Texans (AFL) players